is a former Japanese football player.

Club statistics

References

External links

j-league

1986 births
Living people
Osaka Gakuin University alumni
Association football people from Okayama Prefecture
People from Okayama Prefecture
Japanese footballers
J2 League players
Japan Football League players
Fagiano Okayama players
Association football midfielders